Bass is a municipal committee town and sub-district (Tehsil) in the Indian state of Haryana. It is classified as a mahagram (a large village), with 4 subsections (Bass Badshahpur, Bass Khurd Bejan, Bass Akbarpur and Bass Azamshahpur). Bass is a historical city, hosting one of India’s two Dhola Khuas (the other is in Delhi). Bass is the second city of the Harayana state.

History 
Bass was once a subdivision of Hansi. Its four subsections were converted to a municipal committee in January of 2019.

Geography 
Bass is situated on Bhiwani–Jind Road NH709A in Narnaund. It is a Vidhan Sabha constituency and subdivision in Hisar district.

It is approximately 25 km from Hansi, 30 km from Jind, 39 km from Bhiwani, 59 km from Hisar and 144 km from Delhi. Bass is at the center of Haryana.

Administration
Bass falls under Hisar Lok Sabha constituency. 

Its police station falls under the Hansi Police Department.

See also 
 List of cities in Haryana by population

References

Cities and towns in Hisar district